Julio Luis Cruz (December 2, 1954 – February 22, 2022) was an American professional baseball second baseman for the Seattle Mariners and Chicago White Sox of Major League Baseball from 1977–1986.

Career
Cruz attended Redlands High School in Southern California, and earned all-league honors as a basketball point guard for Redlands. Cruz often said that he played basketball only to maintain his fitness, agility and speed for the baseball season.

Although a lifetime .237 hitter with little power, Cruz had excellent speed. Six years in a row with the Seattle Mariners, from 1978 through 1983, he stole over 40 bases each season and was the team's all-time leader in that statistic leading to his nickname "the Cruzer". His franchise record of 290 was surpassed by Ichiro Suzuki, whose two stolen bases in a game against the Padres on May 18, 2008, gave him a total of 292. Cruz was traded to the Chicago White Sox on June 15, 1983, for fellow second baseman Tony Bernazard. After the trade, the White Sox caught fire and finished the season with 99 wins and a divisional pennant. 

Cruz was inducted into the Hispanic Heritage Baseball Museum Hall of Fame on September 15, 2004, in a pregame on field ceremony at T-Mobile Park, in Seattle. He was a broadcaster for the Mariners.

Personal life and death
Cruz died on February 22, 2022, at the age of 67.

References

External links

1954 births
2022 deaths
Albuquerque Dukes players
Chicago White Sox players
El Paso Diablos players
Fresno Suns players
Hawaii Islanders players
Idaho Falls Angels players
Major League Baseball broadcasters
Major League Baseball second basemen
Minor league baseball managers
Sportspeople from Brooklyn
Baseball players from New York City
Quad Cities Angels players
Salinas Angels players
Salt Lake City Gulls players
Seattle Mariners announcers
Seattle Mariners players